Edmondo Mingione (born 24 October 1952) is an Italian former swimmer. He competed in the men's 100 metre breaststroke at the 1972 Summer Olympics.

References

1952 births
Living people
Italian male swimmers
Olympic swimmers of Italy
Swimmers at the 1972 Summer Olympics
Swimmers from Rome
Italian male breaststroke swimmers
20th-century Italian people